José Astacio (born 17 May 1947) is a Salvadoran sprinter. He competed in the men's 200 metres at the 1968 Summer Olympics.

References

1947 births
Living people
Athletes (track and field) at the 1968 Summer Olympics
Salvadoran male sprinters
Olympic athletes of El Salvador
Sportspeople from San Salvador